Leksand Church is a church building in Leksand in Sweden. It belongs to the Leksand Parish of the Church of Sweden.

References

External links

Churches in the Diocese of Västerås
Leksand
Churches in Dalarna County